Wayne Adam Ford (born December 3, 1961) is an American serial killer. Ford, a former long-haul truck driver, murdered four women from 1997 to 1998. He strangled them and dismembered three of his four victims. He turned himself in with a woman's breast in a bag in his coat pocket.

Background
Ford was born in Petaluma, California, the second son of an American father and a German immigrant mother. His parents divorced when he was 10. He dropped out of high school and enlisted in the U.S. Marine Corps, where he served six years before being honorably discharged in 1985.

In November 1980, he was hit by a drunk driver, leaving him nine days in coma and causing a head injury. According to relatives his personality drastically changed after that.

He had two marriages, both of which ended in divorce. In 1981 he forced his first wife, Kelly Pletcher to get an abortion in Napa, California.

Beginning in 1983, he had escalating problems at work with psychological decline, necessitating several hospitalizations. Ford was diagnosed with borderline personality disorder.

He had a series of scrapes with the law, including allegations of beating and robbing a sex worker in 1986 in Garden Grove, California. In 1990 he was arrested for animal cruelty, for which he served a brief jail sentence in San Clemente, California.

Victims 
Between 1997 and 1998, he murdered at least four women while working. At the time of the murders he lived in a trailer park in Arcata, California working as a long-haul truck driver. 

 Humboldt County Jane Doe - Between the age of 18–25; Killed on October 17, 1997. Her identity remains unknown.
 Tina Renee Gibbs (26) - Killed on May 16, 1998, near Las Vegas. Her body was found on June 2 near Buttonwillow, California.
 Lanette Deyon White (25) - Killed on September 25, 1998, in Ontario, California, then dumped her body near Lodi, California.
 Patricia Anne Tamez (29) - Killed in Hesperia, California. Her body was found on October 23, 1998 in an aqueduct in San Bernardino, California. y

Arrest and trial
Ford turned himself in; he walked into the Humboldt County Sheriff Department in Eureka, California on November 2, 1998, with his brother and had a woman's severed breast in his pocket.  He confessed to having killed four women and is thought to have killed others.

He was found guilty of four counts of first-degree murder on June 27, 2006, and was sentenced to death in August 2006. Currently, he resides on death row at San Quentin State Prison in California.

In Media

Multiple documentaries covered the case.

 In 2013 Investigation Discovery aired a 45-minute long documentary titled Killer Truckers about serial killer truck drivers, including Ford.
 In 2015 TV show Most Evil analyzed the Ford case in season 4. He was ranked 17 out of the 22 levels on the scale.
 In 2019, in a Reelz TV show I Lived With a Killer, Wayne's brother Rodney spoke about their childhood, how he learned about the murders, and  convinced him to turn himself in.
 In 2021, in an episode of Evil Lives Here Wayne's first wife, Kelly Pletcher spoke about their abusive relationship.

See also
 List of death row inmates in the United States
 List of serial killers in the United States

References

External links

Further reading

1961 births
1997 murders in the United States
1998 murders in the United States
20th-century American criminals
American male criminals
American people convicted of murder
American people of German descent
American prisoners sentenced to death
American serial killers
People with borderline personality disorder
Crimes in Humboldt County, California
Criminals from California
Living people
Male serial killers
People convicted of murder by California
People from Petaluma, California
Prisoners sentenced to death by California